Throne Mountain is a prominent  mountain summit located in Jasper National Park, in the South Jasper Ranges of the Canadian Rockies of Alberta, Canada. The peak is composed of sedimentary rock laid down from the Precambrian to the Jurassic periods, that was pushed east and over the top of younger rock during the Laramide orogeny.

History
The peak was named in 1916 by Morrison P. Bridgland because the shape of the mountain resembles a chair.  Bridgland (1878–1948), was a Dominion Land Surveyor who named many peaks in Jasper Park and the Canadian Rockies.

The first ascent of Throne Mountain was made in 1926 by J. W. A. Hickson and Howard Palmer, with guide J. Weber.

This mountain's name was officially adopted in 1935 by the Geographical Names Board of Canada.

Climate

Based on the Köppen climate classification, Throne Mountain is located in a subarctic climate zone with cold, snowy winters, and mild summers. Winter temperatures can drop below  with wind chill factors below . Precipitation runoff from Throne Mountain drains into the Astoria River, thence the Athabasca River.

See also
 List of mountains of Canada
 Geography of Alberta

References

External links
 Parks Canada web site: Jasper National Park
 Weather forecast: Throne Mountain

Three-thousanders of Alberta
Mountains of Jasper National Park
Canadian Rockies